Aljaž Pegan (born 2 June 1974) is a Slovenian gymnast.

Pegan is a world and European champion on the horizontal bar, where he has a skill named after him. He also has an eponymous skill on the parallel bars.

He has competed internationally since 1988, but has not qualified for any Olympic Games due to IFG rules, which do not allow gymnasts to compete only on individual events. He was denied qualification to the 2008 Beijing Games when the "wild card" spot was awarded to a different gymnast.

Notable successes
 1st, 1994 European Men's Artistic Gymnastics Championships, Prague
 3rd, 2000 European Men's Artistic Gymnastics Championships, Bremen
 2nd, 2002 World Artistic Gymnastics Championships, Debrecen
 3rd, 2004 European Men's Artistic Gymnastics Championships, Ljubljana
 1st, 2005 World Artistic Gymnastics Championships, Melbourne
 2nd, 2006 World Artistic Gymnastics Championships, Århus
 2nd, 2007 World Artistic Gymnastics Championships, Stuttgart

External links

RTVSLO, in Slovenian

1974 births
Living people
Slovenian male artistic gymnasts
Originators of elements in artistic gymnastics
World champion gymnasts
Medalists at the World Artistic Gymnastics Championships
Mediterranean Games silver medalists for Slovenia
Mediterranean Games bronze medalists for Slovenia
Competitors at the 1993 Mediterranean Games
Competitors at the 2001 Mediterranean Games
Competitors at the 2009 Mediterranean Games
Mediterranean Games medalists in gymnastics
European champions in gymnastics